The 1903 Michigan State Normal Normalites football team represented Michigan State Normal College (later renamed Eastern Michigan University) during the 1903 college football season.  In their first and only season under head coach Hunter Forest, the Normalites compiled a record of 4–4 and were outscored by a combined total of 88 to 78. Guy E. Bates was the team captain.

Schedule

References

Michigan State Normal
Eastern Michigan Eagles football seasons
Michigan State Normal Normalites football